Lieutenant General Sir William Congreve, 1st Baronet (4 July 1742 – 30 April 1814) was a British military officer who improved artillery strength through gunpowder experiments.

Personal life

William Congreve was born in Stafford on 4 July 1742. He and his first wife, Rebecca Elmston, had four children together, two sons and two daughters. His eldest son, William Congreve, invented the Congreve Rocket. His second wife, Julia-Elizabeth Eyre, died aged 78 in 1831.

Congreve was made a Baronet on 7 December 1812. He died on 30 April 1814. He was succeeded in his posts by his son.

Military career

By 1778 Congreve had obtained the rank of Captain and was appointed Superintendent of Military Machines. He worked out of Woolwich where he had the resources to train artillerymen. Sir William advocated government-run gunpowder mills, arguing that the privately owned concerns "have had such a prodigious profit allowed them" and yet the merchants left the job in the hands of "artful but ignorant Foremen, who probably made a very considerable profit by their Masters' inattention". As during the Seven Years' War England had become increasingly concerned about the low standard of their gunpowder, the government was convinced to purchase an additional set of powder mills instead of farming out production to powder merchants. The Faversham Mill was purchased in 1759, followed by Waltham Abbey in 1787 and Ballincollig in 1804.

Sir William became the deputy comptroller of the Woolwich Royal Laboratory in 1783, with control over the Faversham and Waltham Abbey mills. In 1789, then-Major Congreve was appointed as comptroller. Author Brenda Buchanan asserts, that during his time in these positions, he oversaw three major changes in the manufacturing of gunpowder, being "the substitution of edge runner mills for stamping mills ..., the production of charcoal by low-temperature distillation in closed iron cylinders, and the employment of screw presses for compacting powder into cakes." In this role he also implemented the manufacture of two different kinds of powder, one for muskets and one for canons. Congreve believed that the different powders led to an increase in ballistic force. However Steele and Doorland have suggested that the perceived increase in strength may have come from better quality construction materials.

Congreve oversaw the establishment of two new facilities at Portsmouth and Plymouth which were dedicated to revitalizing damp or lumpy powder, as the procedure for fixing such issues was quicker than the process for making new powder. This resulted in an improved method of extracting saltpetre and consequently higher quality gunpowder.

References

1742 births
1814 deaths
British Army lieutenant generals
British Army personnel of the French Revolutionary Wars
Baronets in the Baronetage of the United Kingdom
Government munitions production in the United Kingdom
People from Stafford
Military personnel from Staffordshire